Trinidad Independent School district is a public school district based in Trinidad, Texas (USA).

The district consists of one campus serving grades PK-12.

Academic achievement
According to tea.state.tx.us/ 2015 Trinidad School District has the rating of "met standard," with a distinction in Mathematics. They are a very driven UIL Academic school.

Special programs

UIL Academics
Trinidad has a very competitive UIL Academic program, and in 2014-2015 competed at the State level in multiple events including One Act Play.

Athletics
Trinidad High School plays six-man football, volleyball, basketball, softball and track.
Six-man Football State Champions (1998)

See also

List of school districts in Texas 
List of high schools in Texas

References

External links
Trinidad ISD

School districts in Henderson County, Texas